The Atlantis Massif is a prominent undersea massif in the North Atlantic Ocean. It is located at approximately 30°8′N latitude 42°8′W longitude; just east of the intersection of the Mid-Atlantic Ridge with the Atlantis Transform Fault. The highest point of the massif is around  beneath the surface.

Description 
It is believed that the massif was formed underneath the nearby Mid-Atlantic Ridge, but pulled from underneath the ridge during the movement of the plates, about 1.5 to 2 million years ago. Geologic studies of the massif have indicated that it is not composed of the black basalt typical of the ocean floor, but rather of dense green peridotite usually found in the mantle. The central dome is corrugated and striated in a way that is representative of an exposed ultramafic oceanic core complex.

An expedition to the area in 1996 made an important advance in the study of the ocean floor. It found that a steeply sloping detachment fault is associated with the oceanic core complex structure. The dome was caused by mantle material being extruded to the surface. Another expedition discovered the Lost City hydrothermal field near the summit of the ridge in 2000.

Another expedition in 2016, the IODP 357 expedition, targeted this massif, drilling cores.

External links 
 View of the Massif
 University of Washington: The Atlantis Massif
 Harvard University: Geology of the Atlantis Massif

References

Geology of the Atlantic Ocean
Plate tectonics
Mid-Atlantic Ridge
Guyots